ISO 1 is an international standard set by the International Organization for Standardization that specifies the standard reference temperature for geometrical product specification and verification. The temperature is fixed at 20 °C, which is equal to 293.15 kelvin and 68 degrees Fahrenheit.

Due to thermal expansion, precision length measurements need to be made at (or converted to) a defined temperature. ISO 1 helps in comparing measurements by defining such a reference temperature. The reference temperature of 20 °C was adopted by the CIPM on 15 April 1931, and became ISO recommendation number 1 in 1951.  It soon replaced worldwide other reference temperatures for length measurements that manufacturers of precision equipment had used before, including 0 °C, 62 °F, and 25 °C. Among the reasons for choosing 20 °C was that this was a comfortable and practical workshop temperature and that it resulted in an integer value on both the Celsius and Fahrenheit scales.

See also
 Metre
 International Organization for Standardization

References

00001
Temperature
Quality control